Alberto Drago, O.P. (died 3 January 1601) was a Roman Catholic prelate who served as Bishop of Termoli (1599–1601).

Biography
Alberto Drago was ordained a priest in the Order of Preachers. 

On 29 November 1599, he was appointed Bishop of Termoli by Pope Clement VIII. On 19 December 1599, he was consecrated bishop by Giulio Antonio Santorio, Cardinal-Bishop of Palestrina, with Metello Bichi, Bishop of Sovana, and Benedetto Mandina, Bishop of Caserta, serving as co-consecrators. 

He served as Bishop of Termoli until his death on 3 January 1601.

References

External links and additional sources
 (Chronology of Bishops) 
 (Chronology of Bishops) 

16th-century Italian Roman Catholic bishops
17th-century Italian Roman Catholic bishops
Bishops appointed by Pope Clement VIII
1601 deaths
Dominican bishops